Benjamin Spradley (born 18 January 1879, date of death unknown) was an American middleweight  boxer who competed in the early twentieth century. He won a silver medal in Boxing at the 1904 Summer Olympics.  His feat, however, was achieved without a Spradley recording a single victory as there were only two entrants in the middleweight division of the Olympic boxing tournament in 1904.  In the only bout in that weight classification, Spradley was knocked out in the third round by fellow American Charles Mayer.

References

1879 births
Year of death missing
Olympic boxers of the United States
Middleweight boxers
Olympic silver medalists for the United States in boxing
Boxers at the 1904 Summer Olympics
American male boxers
Medalists at the 1904 Summer Olympics